El Charco is a town and municipality in the Nariño Department, Colombia.

Climate
El Charco has a tropical rainforest climate (Af) with heavy to very heavy rainfall year-round.

References

Municipalities of Nariño Department